Francisco Javier Hernández Basante (born 20 May 1972) is a Costa Rican chess player. As part of the Costa Rica national team, he has participated in five Chess Olympiads (1994, 2000, 2004, 2006, 2008). He received the FIDE titles of International Master (IM) in 2000 and FIDE Trainer in 2005. His peak FIDE rating was 2320 in July 1998.

References

External links
 
 

1972 births
Living people
Costa Rican chess players
Chess International Masters
Chess Olympiad competitors